Robert Herkimer Bellinger (January 20, 1913 – August 27, 1955) was an American football guard who played two seasons with the New York Giants of the National Football League (NFL). He attended Seattle Preparatory School and played college football at Gonzaga University, both Jesuit schools.

Professional career
Bellinger played in eighteen games, starting ten, for the New York Giants of the NFL from 1934 to 1935.

Personal life
Bellinger died of a heart attack on August 27, 1955, in Santa Clara, California. He was the manager and vice president of the Valley Equipment Company in San Jose at the time of his death.

References

External links
 Just Sports Stats
 

1913 births
1955 deaths
Players of American football from Spokane, Washington
American football guards
Gonzaga Bulldogs football players
New York Giants players
20th-century American businesspeople
Businesspeople from Washington (state)